Stentor amethystinus is a single-celled eukaryote. Algae live in symbiosis with Stentor amethystinus, providing food for the ciliate, which then protects the algae. Unlike many of its relatives, Stentor amethystinus is red-violet in color, due to the chemical amethystin. The chemical amethystin is structurally similar to the chemical stentorin, which belongs to Stentor coeruleus.

References

Heterotrichea